Asma Abbas is a Pakistani actress, producer, singer and host known for her supporting roles in Urdu films and television. She played a role of Fehmida in 2018 acclaim serial Ranjha Ranjha Kardi. She hosted celebrity talkshow Awaz Day Kahan Hai on ATV.Life and career
Abbas is the daughter of writer and journalist Ahmad Bashir and sister of actors Bushra Ansari and Sumbul Shahid Actress Zara Noor Abbas is her daughter In 2018 she recovered from cancer. Some of her notable performance include Dastaan (2010), Gohar-e-Nayab (2013), Nanhi (2013), Laado Mein Pali (2014), Laaj (2016), Koi Chand Rakh (2018), Ranjha Ranjha Kardi (2018), Beti (2018) and Khud Parast (2018). She played Dildar Begum in historical drama Deewar-e-Shab''. In 2019, she has appeared in a talk show Speak Your Heart With Samina Peerzada.

Other work
In July 2020, Asma Abbas launched her clothing line, the traditional day-to-day wear brand Asma Abbas Designs. This collection is dedicated to all women and stand as a tribute to our rangeen, chanchal and evergreen Pakistani heroines.

Filmography

Film

Television

Music video

References

External links

Living people
1958 births
21st-century Pakistani actresses
People from Sindh